Zach Wright (born December 18, 1995) is an American soccer player.

Career

Youth and College
Wright played four years of college soccer at the University of North Carolina at Chapel Hill between 2014 and 2017. During his time with the Tar Heels, Jones tallied 15 goals and 28 assists across 79 appearances.

Wright also played for Premier Development League side Tobacco Road FC in 2017.

Professional
On January 17, 2018, Wright signed a homegrown player contract with MLS side Sporting Kansas City. However, he was waived by the club on February 27, 2018.

Wright signed with United Soccer League side Rio Grande Valley FC on March 16, 2018. He made his professional debut the same day in a 1–1 draw with Saint Louis FC. Wright and Rio Grande Valley mutually parted ways on August 23, 2018.

References

External links

Tar Heels bio

1995 births
American soccer players
Association football forwards
Living people
North Carolina Tar Heels men's soccer players
Tobacco Road FC players
Sporting Kansas City players
Rio Grande Valley FC Toros players
FC Tucson players
USL League Two players
USL Championship players
Soccer players from Texas
People from Smithville, Texas
USL League One players
Homegrown Players (MLS)